Georgi Mamalev (born 5 August 1952) is a Bulgarian actor.

He is one of the founders of the NLO group alongside Velko Kanev and Pavel Popandov.

He has been performing in the Bulgarian national theatre "Ivan Vazov" since 1977. In 2008, Mamalev participated in the Bulgarian show "Dancing stars".

Mamalev is married and has two sons.

References

External links
 

1952 births
20th-century Bulgarian male actors
Bulgarian male film actors
Living people
People from Yambol Province
Bulgarian male stage actors